|}

The Dawn Run Mares Novice Chase, currently known for sponsorship purposes as the Charleville Cheese Irish EBF Mares Novice Chase, is a Grade 2 National Hunt novice chase in Ireland which is open to mares aged four years or older. It is run at Limerick over a distance of 2 miles and 6 furlongs (4,425 metres). The race is scheduled to take place each year in March.

The race was first run in 2002, and was awarded Grade 3 status in 2003. It was raised to Grade 2 status from the 2014 running.

Records
Leading jockey (2 wins):
 Barry Geraghty – Shivermetimber (2005), Knockfierna (2012) 
 Davy Russell - American Jennie (2006), Moskova (2009) 
 Ruby Walsh -  Candy Girl (2008), Vroum Vroum Mag (2015) 
 Paul Townend -  Daisy's Gift (2017), Salsaretta (2020) 
 Denis Hogan - Youcantcallherthat (2018), Moyhenna (2019) 
 Sean O'Keeffe -  Concertista (2021), Allegorie De Vassy (2022) 

Leading trainer  (6 wins):
 Willie Mullins -  Candy Girl (2008), Vroum Vroum Mag (2015), Daisy's Gift (2017), Salsaretta (2020), Concertista (2021), Allegorie De Vassy (2022)

Winners

See also
 Horse racing in Ireland
 List of Irish National Hunt races

References
Racing Post:

National Hunt chases
National Hunt races in Ireland
Limerick Racecourse